James Cornelius Kirkwood Sr. (February 22, 1876 – August 24, 1963) was an American actor and director.

Biography
Kirkwood debuted on screen in 1909 and was soon playing leads for D. W. Griffith. He started directing in 1912, and became a favorite of Mary Pickford, with whom he is rumored to have had an affair. In 1923, he married actress Lila Lee; with her, he had a son, James Kirkwood Jr., who became a successful writer, winning both a Tony Award and a Pulitzer Prize for A Chorus Line. Previously he had been married to Gertrude Robinson, with whom he also had a child. During his marriage to Robinson, he had an affair with Mary Miles Minter, who was 15 at the time. They "married" without clergy in the countryside near Santa Barbara. Their relationship ended after Minter became pregnant with Kirkwood's child and underwent an abortion.

In 1931, he married actress Beatrice Powers, and had a daughter, Joan Mary Kirkwood, with her. They divorced in 1934, with Powers citing mental cruelty. He married Marjorie Davidson (1920–2008) in 1940, and had a son with her, Terrance Michael Kirkwood (born 1941).

He was George Melford's original choice for the starring role of Sheik Ahmed Ben Hassan in The Sheik, which was later famously passed to Rudolph Valentino. His directing career fizzled in 1920, but he continued acting well into the 1950s. His film career would span more than two hundred films over nearly a half century. 
 
He died at the Motion Picture & Television Country House and Hospital.

Selected filmography

 A Corner in Wheat (1909, Short) – The Farmer
 At the Altar (1909, Short)
 The Lonely Villa (1909, Short) – Among Rescuers
 The Hessian Renegades (1909, Short) – Messenger's Father
 Pippa Passes (1909, Short) – Jules
 Fools of Fate (1909, Short) – Ben Webster
 Nursing a Viper (1909, Short) – In Mob
 The Death Disc: A Story of the Cromwellian Period (1909, Short) – Cromwell's Advisor
 The Red Man's View (1909, Short) – Silver Eagle's Father – the Tribal Spokesman (uncredited)
 In Little Italy (1909, Short) – The Sheriff
 To Save Her Soul (1909, Short) – Backstage at Debut / At Party
 The Day After (1909, Short) – Party Guest
 The Rocky Road (1910, Short) – The Best Man
 The Woman from Mellon's (1910, Short) – The Minister
 The Modern Prodigal (1910, Short)
 The Bridal Room (1912, Short) – Minor Role
 The Left-Handed Man (1913, Short) – The Old Soldier
 The House of Discord (1913, Short) – The Wife's Sweetheart
 Home, Sweet Home (1914) – The Mother's Son
 The Eagle's Mate (1914) – Lancer Morne
 Behind the Scenes (1914) – Steve Hunter
 The Green-Eyed Devil (1914, Short, Director)
 Lord Chumley (1914, Short, Director)
 Cinderella (1914, Short, Director)
 Strongheart (1914, Short, Director)
 Gambier's Advocate (1915) – Stephen Gambier
 Little Pal (1915, Director) – Minor Role (uncredited)
 The Heart of Jennifer (1915, Director) – James Murray
 Fanchon the Cricket (1915, Director)
 The Foundling (1916) – Detective
 The Lost Bridegroom (1916, Director)
 Susie Snowflake (1916, Director)
 Dulcie's Adventure (1916, Director)
 Faith (1916, Director)
 The Innocence of Lizette (1916, Director)
 A Dream or Two Ago (1916, Director)
 Over There (1917, Director)
 The Gentle Intruder (1917, Director)
 Environment (1917, Director)
 Annie-for-Spite (1917, Director)
 Periwinkle (1917, Director)
 Melissa of the Hills (1917, Director)
 The Struggle Everlasting (1918, Director)
 The Uphill Path (1918, Director)
 The Luck of the Irish (1920) – William Grogan
 The Scoffer (1920) – Dr. Stannard Wayne
 In the Heart of a Fool (1920) – Grant Adams
 The Forbidden Thing (1920) – Abel Blake
 The Branding Iron (1920) – Pierre Landis
 Love (1920) – Tom Chandler
 Man, Woman & Marriage (1921) – David Courtney
 Bob Hampton of Placer (1921) – Bob Hampton
 A Wise Fool (1921, extant; Library of Congress) – Jean Jacques Barbille
 The Great Impersonation (1921) – Sir Everard Dominey / Leopold von Ragastein
 The Man from Home (1922) – Daniel Forbes Pike
 Under Two Flags (1922) – Cpl. Victor
 Pink Gods (1922) – John Quelch
 The Sin Flood (1922) – O'Neill
 Ebb Tide (1922) – Robert Herrick
 You Are Guilty (1923) – Stephen Martin
 Human Wreckage (1923) – Alan MacFarland
 The Eagle's Feather (1923) – John Trent
 Ponjola (1923) – Lundi Druro
 Discontented Husbands (1924) – Michael Frazer
 Love's Whirlpool (1924) – Jim Reagan
 Wandering Husbands (1924) – George Moreland
 Broken Barriers (1924) – Ward Trenton
 Another Man's Wife (1924) – John Brand
 Circe, the Enchantress (1924) – Dr. Wesley Van Martyn
 The Painted Flapper (1924) – Richard Whitney
 Gerald Cranston's Lady (1924) – Gerald Cranston
 Secrets of the Night (1924 extant) – Robert Andrews
 The Top of the World (1925) – Guy Ranger / Burke Ranger
 The Police Patrol (1925) – Officer Jim Ryan
 That Royle Girl (1925) – Calvin Clarke
 Lover's Island (1925) – Jack Avery
 The Reckless Lady (1926) – Colonel Fleming
 The Wise Guy (1926) – Guy Watson
 Butterflies in the Rain (1926) – John Humphries
 Million Dollar Mystery (1927) – James Norton
 Someone to Love (1928) – Mr. Kendricks
 Black Waters (1929) – Rev. Eph Kelly / Tiger Larabee
 The Time, the Place and the Girl (1929) – The Professor
 Hearts in Exile (1929) – Baron Serge Palma
 The Devil's Holiday (1930) – Mark Stone
 Worldly Goods (1930) – John C. Tullock
 The Spoilers (1930) – Joe Dextry
 Young Sinners (1931) – John Gibson
 A Holy Terror (1931) – William Drew
 Transatlantic (1931) – Sigrid's Beau (uncredited)
 Over the Hill (1931) – Pa Shelby in Prologue
 The Rainbow Trail (1932) – Venters
 Charlie Chan's Chance (1932) – Inspector Flannery
 Cheaters at Play (1932) – Detective Crane
 She Wanted a Millionaire (1932) – Roger Norton
 Lena Rivers (1932) – Henry R. Graham
 Careless Lady (1932) – Judge
 My Pal, the King (1932) – Count DeMar
 Playthings of Desire (1933) – Jim Malvern
 Hired Wife (1934) – Philip Marlowe
 The Lady from Cheyenne (1941) – Politician
 No Hands on the Clock (1941) – Warren Benedict
 Tennessee Johnson (1942) – Senator (uncredited)
 Government Girl (1943) – Senator (uncredited)
 Madame Curie (1945) – Board Member (uncredited)
 The Spanish Main (1945) – Captain Spratlin (uncredited)
 Rendezvous with Annie (1946) – Walters
 I've Always Loved You (1946) – Murphy (uncredited)
 That Brennan Girl (1946) – John Van Derwin (uncredited)
 That's My Man (1947) – Racetrack Man (uncredited)
 Driftwood (1947) – Rev. MacDougal
 The Inside Story (1948) – Townsman (uncredited)
 The Untamed Breed (1948) – Sheriff (uncredited)
 Joan of Arc (1948) – Judge Mortemer (uncredited)
 Red Stallion in the Rockies (1949) – Judge Hardy
 The Doolins of Oklahoma (1949) – Reverend Mears (uncredited)
 Intruder in the Dust (1949) – Convict (uncredited)
 Roseanna McCoy (1949) – A Hatfield (uncredited)
 The Nevadan (1950) – Tex (uncredited)
 Fortunes of Captain Blood (1950) – Physician (uncredited)
 The Lone Ranger (1950, Episode: "Double Jeopardy") – Judge Henry Brady
 Stage to Tucson (1950) – Sheriff Pete Deuce (uncredited)
 Belle Le Grand (1951) – Judge (uncredited)
 Santa Fe (1951) – Surveyor (uncredited)
 Two of a Kind (1951) – Ben (uncredited)
 Man in the Saddle (1951) – Sheriff Medary (uncredited)
 I Dream of Jeanie (1952) – Doctor
 Winning of the West (1953) – Wagon Train Survivor (uncredited)
 The Sun Shines Bright (1953) – Gen. Fairfield
 Woman They Almost Lynched (1953) – Old Man (uncredited)
 The Last Posse (1953) – Judge Parker
 Sweethearts on Parade (1953) – Narrator (voice, uncredited)
 Passion (1954) – Don Rosendo (uncredited)
 Adventures of the Texas Kid: Border Ambush (1954) – Tim Johnson
 The Search for Bridey Murphy (1956) – Brian MacCarthy at Age 68
 Two Rode Together (1961) – Officer (uncredited) (final film role)

References

External links

James Kirkwood Sr. profile at SilentGents.com(with correct photos of the correct James Kirkwood)
Kirkwood & Norma Shearer in Broken Barriers, 1924 (University of Washington's Sayre Collection)
Kirkwood with Mrs. Wallace Reid(Dorothy) in Human Wreckage; 1923(Univ. of Washington, Sayre)
portraits(University of Washington, Sayre)

1876 births
1963 deaths
20th-century American male actors
American Roman Catholics
American male film actors
American male silent film actors
Burials at Holy Cross Cemetery, Culver City
Film directors from Michigan
Male Western (genre) film actors
Male actors from Grand Rapids, Michigan